Tom Dorr is an American politician from Idaho. Dorr was a Republican member of Idaho House of Representatives.

Early life 
Dorr was born in California.

Career 
As a businessman, Dorr owns a trucking company in Idaho.

On November 8, 1994, Dorr won the election and became a Republican member of Idaho House of Representatives for District 4, seat A. Dorr defeated Lou Horvath and Christopher A.C. Smith with 47.6% of the votes. On November 5, 1996, as an incumbent, Dorr sought a seat for District 4, seat A unsuccessfully. Dorr was defeated by Larry C. Watson.

Personal life 
In 1987, Dorr moved to Coeur d'Alene, Idaho. Dorr is married. Dorr has four children. Dorr and his family live in Post Falls, Idaho.

References 

Living people
Republican Party members of the Idaho House of Representatives
People from Post Falls, Idaho
20th-century American politicians
Year of birth missing (living people)